Lamian (simplified Chinese: 拉面; traditional Chinese: 拉麵; pinyin: Lāmiàn) is a type of soft wheat flour Chinese noodle that is particularly common in northern China. Lamian is made by twisting, stretching and folding the dough into strands, using the weight of the dough. The length and thickness of the strands depends on the number of times the dough is folded. This unique method of making noodles originated in China. The Songshi Yangsheng Bu, which was written by Song Xu and dates back to 1504, has the earliest description of the method to make lamian.

Description

The hand-making process involves taking a lump of dough and repeatedly stretching it to produce many strands of thin, long noodle. Literally,  lā, (拉) means to pull or stretch, while miàn (simplified Chinese: 面; traditional Chinese: 麵) means noodle.

There are several styles of twisting the dough but they all employ the same concept: a piece of soft wheat dough is repeatedly stretched and folded onto itself in order to align the glutens and warm up the dough for stretching. Then it is rolled out to a workable thickness and cut into workable portions. The end pieces of the starting dough are never used because the glutens are not as aligned as the middle pieces.

This dough is then pulled to about an arm span's length. The puller then makes a loop with the dough, joining the two ends into one clump of dough and inserts his fingers into the loop to keep the strand from sticking to itself. Doing this, the pull has doubled the length of the dough while fractioning its thickness. This process is repeated several times until the desired thickness and quantity is achieved. Some pullers dip the strands into flour between stretching phases to keep them separated. When flour is used, there generally is a final slap of noodles against the prep board to remove excess flour.

In the Lanzhou style, the dough is worked aggressively. It is pulled in straight, quick, tugs with no twisting or waving. Some pullers regularly slam the noodle against their prep boards to ensure even stretching and uniform thickness. Flour is sometimes used to dust the strands and prevent sticking.

In the Beijing style of preparation, the dough is twisted, stretched delicately by waving the arms and body, untwisted, looped to double the strands and then repeated. When stretching, they coordinate waving their torso and arms to increase the potential length of the noodle beyond that of the puller's arm span. Flour dusting is more liberally employed in this style than in the Lanzhou style of preparation.

There is also another style, in which the noodle maker stretches one thick, flat strand of dough between two hands. This is usually done for show and involves the puller twirling and spinning much like Chinese ribbon dancing.

Use in dishes
Dishes using lamian are usually served in a beef-flavored soup called tangmian (literally 'soup noodles'). However, they are sometimes stir-fried and served with a sauce as a dish called chaomian (literally 'fried noodles'). (This word is etymologically related to chow mein though the dish itself is different.)

Region

China

Small restaurants serving Lanzhou-style lamian are very common throughout Western China where they have formed a staple diet for centuries, as well as Eastern Chinese cities. They tend to serve a variety of low cost meals, with a choice of lamian, knife-cut noodles and perhaps Xi'an-style paomo (steamed bread dipped in soup). Noodles may be served with beef or mutton, either in soup or stir-fried. Lamian can also be served cold with salad ingredients such as shredded cucumber and tomato to make a refreshing summer dish.

Most of the lamian restaurants in China are owned by Hui ethnic families from Northwestern China and serve only halal food (thus no pork dishes). Lamian restaurants are the most common halal restaurants in Eastern China.

Another typical variety of lamian is Shandong lamian, this kind of lamian is produced in Yantai, Shandong Province.

Singapore
Singapore sports 'lamian' restaurants, however the taste may be alien to those accustomed to Chinese lanzhou lamian, as the ingredients are often altered to suit local tastes which are distinctly South-Eastern Chinese. There are nevertheless lamian restaurants in Singapore serving tastes similar if not identical to lanzhou lamian, particularly if run by Chinese migrants.

United States
In New York's Manhattan and Sunset Park Chinatowns, lamian restaurants are a common sight. Most are run by Fuzhounese, some featuring knife-cut noodles, but most featuring only the hand-cut versions. In Manhattan Chinatown, most are located in the Fuzhounese area of Chinatown east of Bowery, while in Sunset Park, sometime referred to as Fuzhou Town, they are scattered along the 8th Avenue strip.

Australia
Lamian restaurants are increasingly found in Australia's Chinatowns and beyond. Most are run by non-Hui, non-Muslim Chinese migrants from mainland China and therefore differ from the typical Muslim 'lamian' restaurants in China, as the meat will not be halal and ingredients such as pork are offered. Whilst in China lamian restaurants are typically cheap in comparison to other local food, in Australia the price of lamian restaurant meals is on par with other Chinese and local food varieties. Whilst in China lamian restaurants are advertised as 'Lanzhou' lamian, regardless of whether the recipes and staff are from Lanzhou, in Australia one finds non-Lanzhou lamian advertised, such as Xi'an lamian and Xinjiang lamian.

Philippines
Manila, Cebu and Davao's Chinatowns have Chinese restaurants serving lamian. Additionally, the Filipino version of noodles, locally called Pancit Canton, is a popular Filipino dish.

Germany
Munich and Frankfurt am Main have Chinese restaurants specialized in serving lamian, located near their respective main train stations.

See also

 Chinese noodles
 Lo mein
 Laghman
 Laksa
 Ramen
 Lanzhou Beef Noodle soup
 Jajangmyeon

Footnotes

Chinese inventions
Chinese noodles